The Water Resources Agency (WRA) is the administrative agency of the Ministry of Economic Affairs of the Taiwan (ROC) responsible for water-related affairs.

History
The creation of Water Resources Agency dated back in 1946 under the Ministry of Water Conservancy of the central government of the Republic of China. The ministry was then downgraded and merged into the Water Conservancy Agency of the Ministry of Economic Affairs in 1948. Within the agency, the Water Conservancy Department was created in 1949. The agency was then reorganized as the Water Resources Bureau of the ministry in 1996. Meanwhile, the Taiwan Provincial Government had Provincial Water Agencies. In 1947, it underwent reorganization to become Water Conservancy Bureau of the Department of Construction of the provincial government. In 1997 after the streamlining of the provincial government, the Water Conservancy Agency of the Ministry of Economic Affairs was created. The Water Resources Agency was created in 2002 with the combination of several agencies, such as Water Resources Bureau, Water Conservancy Agency and Taipei Water Resource Specific Committee.

Organizational structure
 Planning Division
 Hydrology Division
 Management Division
 River and Coast Division
 Conservation Division
 Construction Division
 Water Administration Division
 Land Management Division
 Information Management
 River Survey Team
 Water Hazard Mitigation Center
 Secretariat
 Personnel Office
 Budget, Accounting and Statistics Office
 Civil Service Ethics Office
 Water Resources Office
 River Management Office
 Taipei Water Management Office
 Water Resources Planning Institute

See also
Ministry of Economic Affairs (Taiwan)

References

1946 establishments in Taiwan
Executive Yuan